is a railway station in Sumida, Tokyo, Japan, operated by Tobu Railway.

Lines

Station layout

The station consists of two opposed side platforms serving two tracks.

Platforms

Adjacent stations

History
The station opened on 15 April 1928.

Route bus
Bus which pass through the station is only すみだ百景 すみまるくん・すみりんちゃん　北東部ルート – Sumida Hyakkei Sumimarukun・Sumimaruchan　Hokutobu Route . And the bus stop is named as Higashi-Azuma Station and it is located due west of the station. It takes about 2 minutes from here to the bus stop on foot.

Surrounding area
 Tokyo Tachibana High School

References

External links

 Tobu station information 

Railway stations in Japan opened in 1928
Railway stations in Tokyo